Poshteh-ye Ziarat or Poshteh Ziarat may refer to:
 Poshteh-ye Ziarat, Hormozgan